is a Japanese professional footballer who plays forward for Júbilo Iwata in the J1 League.

Career
Born in Ōita Prefecture, Matsumoto made his debut for Oita Trinita of the J. League Division 1 on 20 March 2013 in the J. League Cup against Albirex Niigata in which he started and played 64 minutes before being subbed off for Yasuhito Morishima as Oita won the match 1–1.

International
Matsumoto played in all five games for the Japan U17 team during the 2011 FIFA U-17 World Cup in which Japan U17 made it to the quarter-finals of the tournament before bowing out to Brazil U17s. He then played for the Japan U20s during the 2012 AFC U-19 Championship in which he played and started in all four matches that Japan played before bowing out in the quarter-finals to Iraq U20s 2–1 and also missing a chance to qualify for the 2013 FIFA U-20 World Cup in the process.

Career statistics

Club
Updated to 8 August 2022.

References

External links

Profile at Júbilo Iwata

1995 births
Living people
People from Nakatsu, Ōita
Association football people from Ōita Prefecture
Japanese footballers
Japan youth international footballers
Japan under-20 international footballers
J1 League players
J2 League players
J3 League players
Oita Trinita players
Júbilo Iwata players
Association football midfielders